Spalacopsis stolata is a species of beetle in the family Cerambycidae. It was described by Newman in 1842. Also referred to as Spalacopsis pertenuis.

Range
It is native to the Continental US.

References

Spalacopsis
Beetles described in 1842